Ortalis is an historic genus of Ulidiid or picture-winged flies, first described by Fallén in 1810. It served as the type genus for the family Ulidiidae, which was called Ortalidae at the time. In 1932, it was pointed out by Adlrich that the name Ortalis was preoccupied by a genus of birds (in family Cracidae) which had been named by Merrem in 1786. The name of the fly family was therefore revised, with some authors calling it Otitidae until Ulidiidae was settled on as standard. The genus itself was found to be paraphyletic, and all of its species have been reassigned to other genera, some in the Ulidiidae, and some in other Tephritoid families. In the following list, the species are organized according to the families and genera to which they have been reassigned.

Family Ulidiidae

Ceroxys

 Ortalis cinifera (Loew, 1846) → Ceroxys cinifera
 Ortalis confusa (Becker, 1912) → Ceroxys confusa
 Ortalis fraudulosa (Loew, 1864) → Ceroxys fraudulosa
 Ortalis laticornis → Ceroxys laticornis

Chaetopsis

 Ortalis aenea (Wiedemann, 1830) → Chaetopsis aenea
 Ortalis trifasciata (Wiedemann, 1830) → Chaetopsis aenea
 Ortalis massyla (Walker, 1849) → Chaetopsis massyla

Eumecosomyia

 Ortalis nubila (Wiedemann, 1830) → Eumecosomyia nubila

Euxesta

 Ortalis basalis (Walker, 1852) → Euxesta basalis
 Ortalis leucomelas (Walker, 1860) → Euxesta leucomelas
 Ortalis notata (Wiedemann, 1830) → Euxesta notata
 Ortalis platystoma (Thomson, 1869) → Euxesta spoliata
 Ortalis sororcula Wiedemann, 1830 → Euxesta sororcula

Herina

 Ortalis lacustris (Meigen, 1826) → Herina lacustris
 Ortalis lugubris (Meigen, 1826) → Herina lugubris
 Ortalis palustris (Meigen, 1826) → Herina palustris
 Ortalis parva (Loew, 1864) → Herina parva
 Ortalis tristis (Meigen, 1826) → Herina tristis
 Ortalis bifasciata Loew, 1858 → Herina tristis
 Ortalis gyrans Loew, 1864 → Herina tristis

Hypochra
 Ortalis albipennis (Loew, 1846) → Hypochra albipennis

Idana

 Ortalis marginata (Say, 1830) → Idana marginata

Melieria

 Ortalis acuticornis (Loew, 1854) → Melieria acuticornis
 Ortalis cana (Loew, 1858) → Melieria cana
 Ortalis omissa (Meigen, 1826) → Melieria omissa
 Ortalis unicolor (Loew, 1854) → Melieria unicolor

Otites

 Ortalis angustata (Loew, 1859) → Otites angustata
 Ortalis bimaculata (Hendel, 1911) → Otites bimaculata
 Ortalis dominula (Loew, 1868) → Otites dominula
 Ortalis erythrocephala (Hendel, 1911) → Otites erythrocephala
 Ortalis grata (Loew, 1856) → Otites grata
 Ortalis nebulosa (Meigen, 1830) → Otites nebulosa
 Ortalis snowi (Cresson, 1924) → Otites snowi
 Ortalis stigma (Hendel, 1911) → Otites stigma

Pseudotephritis

 Ortalis vau (Say, 1829) → Pseudotephritis vau

Pterotaenia

 Ortalis fasciata (Wiedemann, 1830) → Pterotaenia fasciata

Seioptera

 Ortalis costalis (Walker, 1849) → Seioptera costalis

Family Platystomatidae

Atopognathus
 Ortalis complens (Walker, 1859) → Atopognathus complens
 Ortalis leucomerus → Atopognathus leucomerus
 Ortalis tarsalis → Atopognathus tarsalis

Cleitamia
 Ortalis astrolabei (Boisduval, 1835) → Cleitamia astrolabei

Engistoneura
 Ortalis paralleia → Engistoneura paralleia

Euxestomoea
 Ortalis prompta (Walker, 1859) → Euxestomoea prompta

Neoardelio
 Ortalis alternatus → Neoardelio alternatus

Poecilotraphera
 Ortalis comperei (Coquillett) → Poecilotraphera comperei

Pseudepicausta
 Ortalis bigotii (Macquart, 1851) → Pseudepicausta bigotii

Rhytidortalis
 Ortalis conformis (Walker, 1853) → Rhytidortalis conformis (or incertae sedis)

Rivellia
 Ortalis aequifera (Walker, 1862) → Rivellia aequifera
 Ortalis bipars (Walker, 1861) → Rivellia bipars
 Ortalis concisivitta (Walker, 1862) → Rivellia concisivitta
 Ortalis decatomoides (Walker, 1862) → Rivellia decatomoides
 Ortalis isara → Rivellia isara
 Ortalis ligata (Say, 1830) → Rivellia ligata
 Ortalis mentissa (Walker, 1849) → Rivellia mentissa
 Ortalis obliqua (Walker, 1861) → Rivellia obliqua
 Ortalis vacillans (Walker, 1860) → Rivellia vacillans

Traphera
 Ortalis chalybea → Traphera chalybea

Zygaenula
 Ortalis dispila (Thomson, 1869) → Zygaenula dispila (or incertae sedis)

Family Richardiidae
Automola
 Ortalis atomaria → Automola atomaria

Family Tephritidae
Pseudoedaspis
 Ortalis decorata (Blanchard, 1852) → Pseudoedaspis decorata
 Ortalis striolata (Blanchard, 1852) → Pseudoedaspis striolata

Uncertain
 Ortalis fenestrata → ???
 Ortalis flavoscutellata → ???
 Ortalis longicornis → ???
 Ortalis picta → ???
 Ortalis quinquemaculata → ???
 Ortalis semivitta → ???

References

 
Ulidiidae
Obsolete arthropod taxa